Cannabis in French Guiana is illegal, but is illicitly cultivated and transported.

Economy
In the 1980s and 1990s it was reported that cannabis grown in Brazil was smuggled to Cayenne and French Guiana.

Usage
A 2007 report noted that use of cannabis by youth in French Guiana was at 6%.

References

 Guiana
French Guiana
Politics of French Guiana
French Guiana
French Guiana